

Films

References

LGBT
1973 in LGBT history
1973
1973